Deltaform Mountain is one of the mountains in the Valley of the Ten Peaks, located on the Continental Divide on the border of British Columbia and Alberta, and also on the border between Banff and Kootenay National Parks in Canada. The mountain was originally named Saknowa by Samuel Allen but Walter Wilcox named it to its official title in 1897 as it resembles the Greek letter delta.

Deltaform was first climbed in 1903 by August Eggers and Herschel Clifford Parker who were guided by Christian and Hans Kaufmann.


Climbing routes 

The two main climbing routes are:
 North-West Ridge (Normal Route) II 5.5
 North Face, The Supercouloir IV 5.8

Geology

Deltaform Mountain is composed of sedimentary rock laid down during the Precambrian to Jurassic periods. Formed in shallow seas, this sedimentary rock was pushed east and over the top of younger rock during the Laramide orogeny.

Climate

Based on the Köppen climate classification, Deltaform is located in a subarctic climate with cold, snowy winters, and mild summers. Temperatures can drop below  with wind chill factors below .

See also
List of peaks on the British Columbia–Alberta border

References 

Three-thousanders of Alberta
Three-thousanders of British Columbia
Canadian Rockies
Mountains of Banff National Park
Kootenay National Park
Borders of Alberta
Borders of British Columbia
Great Divide of North America